Sherlock is a feature on Earth's Moon, a crater in Taurus–Littrow valley.  Astronauts Eugene Cernan and Harrison Schmitt drove their rover to the north of it in 1972, on the Apollo 17 mission.  They photographed the rim, as shown below.

Sherlock is about 1 km east of the Apollo 17 landing site.  To the south of it is Steno crater and to the north are Van Serg and Shakespeare.

The crater was named by the astronauts after the fictional Sherlock Holmes from the works of Sir Arthur Conan Doyle.

References

External links
43D1S2(25) Apollo 17 Traverses at Lunar and Planetary Institute
Geological Investigation of the Taurus–Littrow Valley: Apollo 17 Landing Site

Impact craters on the Moon
Apollo 17